Shashank Bali is an Indian television director. His first television directorial venture was F.I.R. (TV series), followed by Lapataganj, an Indian television sitcom. After nine years of its successful run, F.I.R. went off air and Bali started with another Indian television sitcom, Bhabi Ji Ghar Par Hai! along with its spin-off, Happu ki Ultan Paltan and also Jijaji Chhat Par Hai on another channel. He has also simultaneously directed May I Come In Madam? and Sahib, Biwi aur boss.

Television
F.I.R. (TV series) (2006-2015)
Lapataganj (2009-2014)
Bhabi Ji Ghar Par Hai! (2015–present)
Sahib Biwi Aur Boss (2015-2016)
May I Come In Madam? (2016)
Jijaji Chhat Par Hai (2018–2020)
Happu Ki Ultan Paltan (2019–present)
'''''Jijaji Chhat Parr Koii Hai (2021)
Jijaji Chhat Parr Phirr Hai ? (2022  DECEMBER )

Awards

Indian Telly Awards

Indian Television Academy Awards

References

External links
 

2015 Indian television series debuts
Hindi-language television shows